Pentazole is an aromatic molecule consisting of a five-membered ring with all nitrogen atoms, one of which is bonded to a hydrogen atom.  It has the molecular formula . Although strictly speaking a homocyclic, inorganic compound, pentazole has historically been classed as the last in a series of heterocyclic azole compounds containing one to five nitrogen atoms. This set contains pyrrole, imidazole, pyrazole, triazoles, tetrazole, and pentazole.

Derivatives
Substituted analogs of pentazole are collectively known as pentazoles.  As a class, they are unstable and often highly explosive compounds.  The first pentazole synthesized was phenylpentazole, where the pentazole ring is highly stabilized by conjugation with the phenyl ring.  The derivative 4-dimethylaminophenylpentazole is among the most stable pentazole compounds known, although it still decomposes at temperatures over 50 °C.  It is known that electron-donating groups stabilize aryl pentazole compounds.

Ions 
The cyclic pentazolium cation is not known due to its probable antiaromatic character; whereas the open-chained pentazenium cation is known. Butler et al.  first demonstrated the presence of the cyclic  in solution through the decomposition of substituted aryl pentazoles at low temperature. These results were initially challenged by some authors, but subsequent experiments involving the detailed analysis of the decomposition products, complemented by computational studies, bore out the initial conclusion. The pentazolide anion is not expected to last longer than a few seconds in aqueous solution without the aid of complexing agents.

In 2002, the pentazolate anion was first detected with electrospray ionization mass spectrometry In 2016, the ion was also detected in solution. In 2017, white cubic crystals of the pentazolate salt, (N5)6(H3O)3(NH4)4Cl were announced. In this salt, the  rings are planar. The bond lengths in the ring are 1.309 Å, 1.310 Å, 1.310 Å, 1.324 Å, and 1.324 Å. When heated, the salt is stable up to 117 °C, and over this temperature it decomposes to ammonium azide. Under extreme pressure conditions, the pentazolate ion was also synthesized. It was first obtained in 2016 in the form of the CsN5 salt by compressing and laser-heating a mixture of CsN3 embedded in molecular N2 at 60 GPa. Following the pressure release, it was found metastable down to 18 GPa. In 2018, another team reported the high pressure synthesis of LiN5 above 45 GPa from a pure lithium surrounded by molecular nitrogen. This compound could be retained down to ambient conditions after the complete release of pressure.

References 

Nitrogen hydrides
Explosive chemicals
 
Simple aromatic rings